The Alcoa Police Department is the primary provider of law enforcement services for Alcoa, Tennessee.

Organizational structure

The Alcoa Police Department is headed by the Chief of Police. The department currently has an assigned strength of 37 police officers and 8 civilian staff members. The department operations are divided between two divisions, the Administrative Division, and the Operations Division.

Chief of Police
The Chief of the Alcoa Police Department is responsible for all activities carried out through the department. The Chief of Police reports directly to the Mayor and City Council of Alcoa. The current Chief of Police is David Carswell.

Administrative Division
The Administrative Division is responsible for all civilian support functions, including records, evidence holding, accreditation, and internal affairs.

Operations Division
The Operations Division of the department is responsible for all law enforcement and investigations conducted by the department. The two units that make up the division are the Patrol Unit and the Detective Unit, both commanded by a Lieutenant. The current commander of the Operations Division as of 2010 is Captain Dale Boring.

Rank structure

See also

 List of law enforcement agencies in Tennessee

External links
 Department Homepage
 Annual Report

Blount County, Tennessee
Municipal police departments of Tennessee
Alcoa, Tennessee